Women in Revolt is a 1971 American satirical film produced by Andy Warhol and directed by Paul Morrissey. The film stars Jackie Curtis, Candy Darling, and Holly Woodlawn, three trans women and superstars of Warhol's Factory scene. It also features soundtrack music by John Cale.

This film is notable as the last with Warhol behind the camera. During production from 1970 to 1971, Jackie Curtis insisted that Warhol shoot the film, or she threatened to leave the project. The film satirizes the Women's Liberation Movement, and alludes to Valerie Solanas and the SCUM Manifesto.

Plot
Holly and Jackie form a small group of "women's libbers." They convince Candy, a wealthy socialite who has an incestous
relationship with her brother, to join them at their meetings. The group needs Candy's membership to bring money and "glamour" to their cause.

Cast

See also
 List of American films of 1971
 Andy Warhol filmography

References

External links

Review of Women In Revolt

1971 comedy films
Cultural depictions of Valerie Solanas
Films directed by Paul Morrissey
American LGBT-related films
Films scored by John Cale
LGBT-related black comedy films
1971 LGBT-related films
1971 films
American comedy films
Films about trans women
1970s English-language films
1970s American films